The Kenyon Medal is awarded every two years by the British Academy 'in recognition of work in the field of classical studies and archaeology'. The medal was endowed by Sir Frederic Kenyon and was first awarded in 1957.

List of recipients
Source: British Academy

1957 – John Beazley
1959 – Michael Ventris (posthumously)
1961 – Edgar Lobel
1963 – Carl Blegen
1965 – Eduard Fraenkel
1967 – Maurice Bowra
1969 – Denys Page
1971 – E. R. Dodds
1973 – A. S. F. Gow
1975 – Ronald Syme
1977 – Rudolf Pfeiffer
1979 – Bernard Ashmole
1981 – Arnaldo Momigliano
1983 – Arthur Dale Trendall
1985 – D. R. Shackleton Bailey
1987 – Martin Robertson
1989 – F. W. Walbank
1991 – Homer Thompson
1993 – Kenneth Dover
1995 – John Boardman
1997 – Robin G. M. Nisbet
1999 – Brian B. Shefton
2001 – no award
2002 – Martin Litchfield West
2003 – Nicolas Coldstream
2005 – Fergus Millar
2007 – Geoffrey Lloyd
2009 – James Noel Adams
2011 – David Peacock
2013 – Alan Cameron
2015 – Nigel Guy Wilson
2017 – Joyce Reynolds
2019 - Peter Parsons
2020 - Averil Cameron
2021 - David Breeze
2022 - T. P. Wiseman

See also

 Awards of the British Academy
 List of archaeology awards
 List of history awards
 List of awards named after people

References

British Academy
British awards
Academic awards
Archaeology awards
Awards established in 1957
1957 establishments in England